The New York Attorney General election, 2006 took place on November 7, 2006. Democrat Andrew Cuomo was elected to replace Eliot Spitzer (who became Governor) as the Attorney General of New York.

Candidates

Democratic Party
Andrew Cuomo, former Secretary of Housing and Urban Development
Mark Green, former New York City Public Advocate
Sean Patrick Maloney, former White House Staff Secretary
Charlie King, former Department of Housing and Urban Development official

Republican Party
Jeanine Pirro, Westchester County District Attorney

Green Party
Rachel Treichler, lawyer and previous Green Party candidate for the New York State Assembly and the U.S. House of Representatives

Libertarian Party
Christopher B. Garvey, patent and trademark attorney

Socialist Workers Party
Martin Koppel, political organizer and writer

Opinion polls

Democratic primary

General election

Election results

Primary

Democratic

Republican

General

References

See also
New York gubernatorial election, 2006
New York United States Senate election, 2006
New York Comptroller election, 2006
Paterson, David "Black, Blind, & In Charge: A Story of Visionary Leadership and Overcoming Adversity." New York, New York, 2020

Attorney General
2006
New York
Andrew Cuomo